Istrianis wachtlii is a moth of the family Gelechiidae. It is found in Egypt, Jordan and south-western Iran.

The wingspan is about 8 mm.

The larvae feed on Tamarix articulata.

References

Moths described in 1881
Istrianis